The World Golf Championships (WGC) are a group of annual professional golf tournaments created by the International Federation of PGA Tours as a means of gathering the best players in the world together more frequently than the pre-existing four major championships. All WGC tournaments are official money events on the PGA Tour and the European Tour, and officially sanctioned by the Asian Tour, Japan Golf Tour, Sunshine Tour, and PGA Tour of Australasia.

The WGC tournaments offer comparable prize money to the major championships. In the pantheon of golf events, the WGCs rank below the major championships and above most other competitions, although The Players Championship, promoted by the PGA Tour as the "fifth major", may also claim such status.

Despite the name, the World Golf Championships do not claim to crown a recognised 'world champion'.

Golf reporters have speculated that the era of World Golf Championships have come to an end as the PGA Tour announced the 2023 WGC Match Play would be the last. The only WGC still technically active is the WGC-HSBC Champions but that hasn't been played in over three years due to COVID-19 and PGA Tour commissioner Jay Monahan admitted: "It's difficult to foresee when we would play." Instead, the PGA Tour has pursued an "elevated status" for some existing events which have some similarities to WGC events (smaller fields, no cut, higher prize money), in response to LIV Golf.

Events

The WGC Championship, WGC Match Play and WGC Invitational events all began in 1999, although the WGC Invitational is the direct successor of the World Series of Golf, which began in 1976 and the WGC Match Play is a direct successor to the Andersen Consulting World Championship of Golf which began in 1995. The WGC Championship originally traveled to different venues around the world. After 2006 it found a home at Doral Resort in Florida superseding the Doral Open, a long-standing event on the PGA Tour. Between 2000 and 2006, the men's World Cup was accorded WGC status. The WGC Champions, first held in 2005, was awarded World Golf Championships status starting with the 2009 edition, becoming the fourth WGC tournament on the worldwide calendar.

In April 2011, the Sunshine Tour announced that it would host a fifth WGC event. The event, to be known as the Tournament of Hope, was to be linked to awareness of poverty and HIV/AIDS in Africa. In early 2012 it was announced that the tournament would be played in 2013; later in 2012 it was announced that the tournament would not be a WGC event, but ultimately the tournament never took place.

The WGC concept was introduced to create a larger group of golf tournaments with a high global profile by bringing the leading golfers from different tours together on a more regular basis, rather than just for the major championships. At the time the publicity spoke of a "World Tour" which might develop on the basis of the World Championships and the majors.

The "World Tour" concept seems to have been dropped, but the four events usually attract almost all of the elite players who are eligible to compete and they rank among the most prestigious and high-profile events outside of the majors. The prize money on offer is very close to being the highest for any professional golf tournament. Winners generally receive 70 to 78 Official World Golf Rankings points, the most awarded for any tournament apart from the major championships, which carry 100 points, and The Players Championship, which is allocated 80. Tiger Woods has dominated these tournaments, winning 16 of the first 32 individual (non-World Cup) events and winning at least one event each year from 1999 to 2009.

From 2000 to 2006 the men's golf World Cup, a tournament for teams of two players representing their country, was a World Golf Championship event, although it was not an official money event on any tour. Beginning in 2007 it is no longer part of the World Golf Championships, but it is still played, and is currently known as the Mission Hills World Cup.

Also from 2000 to 2006, two or three of the four events were staged in the United States in most of the years, and one or two were staged elsewhere. Starting in 2007, all three of the individual World Golf Championships events were played in the United States, which attracted criticism from some golfers, including Tiger Woods and Ernie Els, and in the media outside the United States. PGA Tour Commissioner Tim Finchem responded by insisting that playing in the U.S is best for golf as more money can be made there than elsewhere. This criticism has been muted since the 2009 elevation of the HSBC Champions, held in China, to full WGC status. In addition, the WGC-Mexico Championship in 2017 marked the move of half the WGC events to outside the United States. At the end of the 2021 season, the number of WGC events was reduced to two, the Match Play and the HSBC Champions. The HSBC Champions was not held between 2020 and 2022 due to the COVID-19 pandemic, and the Match Play will cease following the 2023 edition.

The winners receive Wedgwood trophies named for a golf legend. The HSBC Champions features the Old Tom Morris Cup; the Dell Match Play Championship, the Walter Hagen Cup; the Mexico Championship, the Gene Sarazen Cup; and the Fedex St. Jude Invitational, the Gary Player Cup.

Winners

Multiple winners
Dustin Johnson  is the only player to win all four individual WGCs. Tiger Woods' 18 WGC victories dwarfs his nearest rival, Johnson, with six. Although not counting as individual wins, Woods also won the then WGC-World Cup with the United States, and 2-time WGC winner Ernie Els won the same competition with South Africa.

 Note: The World Cup did not count as individual wins, so it is not mentioned here as a part of this table.

National summary

Notes

References

External links
Official site

 
World championships in golf